Michael Dennis Bernacchi Jr. (born 1965) is a United States Navy rear admiral who serves as the deputy commander of the United States Tenth Fleet.

Early life and education
Bernacchi was raised in Pleasant Ridge, Michigan, where his father was a professor of marketing at the nearby University of Detroit. The younger Bernacchi attended Shrine High School and graduated from the University of Detroit in 1988 with a B.S. degree in biology. He later earned master's degrees in nuclear engineering and industrial engineering from the University of Michigan.

Military career
From August 9, 2017, to April 25, 2017, Bernacchi commanded the Naval Service Training Command.

In June 2020, Bernacchi was reassigned to the United States Space Command as the director of strategy, plans, and policy. He started in his new assignment on July 10, 2020. In March 2022, he was reassigned as deputy commander of the United States Tenth Fleet.

Dates of promotion

References

External links 
 

1965 births
Living people
Place of birth missing (living people)
People from Pleasant Ridge, Michigan
University of Detroit Mercy alumni
University of Michigan College of Engineering alumni
United States submarine commanders
Recipients of the Legion of Merit
United States Navy rear admirals
Military personnel from Michigan